The Miami Hurricanes men's basketball team is the college basketball team of the University of Miami in Coral Gables, Florida. The team competes in the Atlantic Coast Conference (ACC).

The University of Miami men's basketball team was formed in 1926, but the program was later dropped by the university in 1971. In 1985, fourteen years later, the Hurricanes resumed play as an independent and joined the Big East Conference in 1991, winning the Big East regular season title in 2000. In 2004, in conjunction with the rest of the Miami athletic program, the team moved to the ACC. In 2012–2013, the team won its first regular season ACC championship as well as its first ACC championship. The team has reached the NCAA Championship's "Sweet 16" four times (1999–2000, 2012–2013, 2015–2016, and 2021–2022) and the "Elite 8" once, in 2021–2022. In the 2014–2015 season, they reached the final of the National Invitation Tournament (NIT).

The Hurricanes are currently coached by Jim Larrañaga and play their home games at the Watsco Center.

History

Perry Clark era (1999–2004)

Perry Clark took over the program at Miami in 2000 and spent four seasons with the Hurricanes, where he led them to a 65–54 (.546) record. In his first three seasons with the program, he accumulated 51 wins, the most ever by a Hurricane coach, and became the only Miami coach to take the Hurricanes to the postseason in each of his first two seasons.

Clark's 2001–02 Hurricane squad finished 24–8 and received the school's fourth NCAA Tournament berth and set a school record for wins in a season. Included in the 24 wins were a school-record 14 consecutive victories to open the season. His Hurricanes were not ranked in the preseason, but were ranked for the final 13 weeks of the campaign, ending the year No. 21 according to the Associated Press.

Frank Haith era (2004–2011)

Frank Haith was hired on April 11, 2004 and tasked with leading the Hurricanes into the Atlantic Coast Conference.  In his first season, Haith took a team that was coming off two straight losing seasons and picked to finish last in the ACC and guided it to the postseason for the first time since 2002.  As a result, Haith was a finalist for the Naismith National Coach of the Year Award.

Haith again took Miami to the NIT in 2005, and the Hurricanes won their first two games before bowing out in a loss to the Michigan Wolverines.  It was just the second time in Miami's basketball history that the Hurricanes had won back-to-back postseason games.

Haith reached just one NCAA tournament as the head coach at Miami, leading the Hurricanes to a second-round appearance in 2008. The next season, Haith's team returned four starters, including sharpshooter Jack McClinton. Miami began the season ranked 16th in the USA Today/ESPN pre-season poll, and the media picked it to finish fourth in the ACC. However, Miami finished below .500 in conference play and missed the NCAA tournament, instead participating in the NIT. The following season, Haith's team finished in last place in the ACC.

Haith has also led the Hurricanes to success off-the-court. Under Haith's tenure, all eight Miami senior basketball players who have completed their eligibility have earned their degrees. Miami also placed three players on the ACC All-Academic basketball team for the 2004–2005 season, more than any school in the conference.

Jim Larrañaga era (2011–present)

On April 22, 2011, Jim Larrañaga accepted the head coaching position at the University of Miami. In his first season at Miami, he led the team to a 9–7 record in-conference. It marked the school's first ever winning record in the ACC.

In his second season, Larrañaga led the Hurricanes to arguably their best season since the Rick Barry era. They won the ACC regular-season title (the first time in 11 years, and only the fourth time in 32 years, that a team from North Carolina had not won at least a share of the title). The highlight of the season was an unprecedented 90–63 rout of #1 ranked Duke. That win was Miami's first-ever defeat of a top-ranked team, and the largest margin of defeat for a #1 team ever.

On March 17, 2013, Larrañaga coached the Hurricanes to the ACC tournament title—the first tournament title in the program's history — with an 87–77 win over North Carolina. On April 4, 2013, Larrañaga was voted the Associated Press' college basketball coach of the year. A week later, the Hurricanes advanced to the Sweet 16 of the NCAA tournament with their school-record 29th win. The season ended the following weekend with a loss to Marquette. He claimed the Hurricanes had not enough energy to win the game because of Reggie Johnson's injury and Shane Larkin's sickness.

Postseason

NCAA tournament results
The Hurricanes have appeared in the NCAA tournament 11 times. Their combined record is 11–11.

NIT results
The Hurricanes have appeared in the National Invitation Tournament (NIT) 12 times. Their combined record is 11–12.

Notable players

Retired numbers

Honored jerseys 
"Honored" players are those former athletes who have had their jerseys hanging at the Watsco Center rafters, although those numbers are not officially retired.

National Player of the Year
2013 – Shane Larkin, Lute Olson National Player of the Year

All-Americans
 1960 – Dick Hickox, AP Second Team
 1965 – Rick Barry, Consensus First Team
 1970 – Don Curnutt, Helms Second Team
 1999 – Tim James, AP Third Team
 2013 – Shane Larkin, AP, NABC Second Team, Sporting News Third Team, John Wooden All-American, Bob Cousy Award Finalist, John R. Wooden Award Finalist
 2023 – Isaiah Wong, NABC Third Team

ACC Player of the Year
2013 – Shane Larkin (Coaches)

2023 – Isaiah Wong

All-ACC Teams

First Team All-ACC:
 Jack McClinton, 2008, 2009
 Shane Larkin, 2013
 Kameron McGusty, 2022
 Isaiah Wong, 2023

Second Team All-ACC:
 Guillermo Diaz, 2005, 2006
 Kenny Kadji, 2013
 Sheldon McClellan, 2016
 Jordan Miller, 2023

Third Team All-ACC:

 Robert Hite, 2006
 Jack McClinton, 2007
 Malcolm Grant, 2011
 Kenny Kadji, 2012
 Rion Brown, 2014
 Tonye Jekiri, 2016
 Isaiah Wong, 2022
 Norchad Omier, 2023

ACC All-Rookie Team:

 Durand Scott, 2010
 Shane Larkin, 2012

ACC All-Defensive Team:
 Anthony King, 2005
 Shane Larkin, 2013
 Durand Scott, 2013
 Tonye Jekiri, 2015, 2016
 Charlie Moore, 2022

ACC All-Tournament Team:
 Shane Larkin, 2013 (MVP)
 Durand Scott, 2013
 Julian Gamble, 2013 (2nd Team)
 Trey McKinney-Jones, 2013 (2nd Team)

Big East Player of the Year
1999 – Tim James

All-Big East Teams
First Team All-Big East:
 Tim James, 1998, 1999
 Johnny Hemsley, 1999

Second Team All-Big East:
 Tim James, 1997
 Johnny Hemsley, 2000
 Darius Rice, 2002, 2004
 John Salmons, 2002

Third Team All-Big East:
 Constantin Popa, 1993, 1995
 Mario Bland, 2000
 John Salmons, 2001
 James Jones, 2002
 Darius Rice, 2003

Big East All-Rookie Team:
 Steven Edwards, 1993
 Kevin Norris, 1995
 Tim James, 1996
 Darius Rice, 2001
 Guillermo Diaz, 2004

Big East All-Tournament Team:
 Jerome Scott, 1992
 Tim James, 1999
 Marcus Barnes, 2002

All-time leaders

Points

Rebounds

Assists

Steals

Blocks

Coaches

Storm Surge

Origins
Storm Surge is the official student section of Miami Hurricanes men's and women's basketball. It was founded in 2011. Prior to Storm Surge's creation, Miami had been victim to years of inconsistent student attendance and a lack of student interest in the basketball program, and prior attempts to create a lasting student section such as "UBeach" and "Haith's Faithful" were largely unsuccessful. Storm Surge works directly with Miami's athletic department to enhance the game day experience and encourage greater involvement from the student body. Storm Surge began with 500 members, but saw average student attendance jump to over 1,100 for ACC games in 2012–2013, its second season. As student capacity at the BUC is limited, students are admitted on a first-come, first-served basis, with students often arriving hours beforehand or camping out to get the best seats.

Traditions
Storm Surge has become famous for its creative and unique free throw chants and distractions, digging up embarrassing facts and pictures of opposing players, and its slogan, "Pack The BUC," which can be seen on T-shirts, signs, and promotional materials at University of Miami home games. Like many student sections, Storm Surge distributes cheer sheets prior to each game, detailing specific cheers for that game. The group also has the ability to create cheers on the fly through the use of a large whiteboard at the front of the student section, which is used to coordinate all cheers.

Storm Surge's official color is orange, and all members wear orange to every game. The student section is situated behind both baskets and consists of bleacher seating and traditional seating. As bleacher seating is closest to the floor, the students in the bleachers are typically the team's biggest supporters. Before each game, Storm Surge sings the national anthem together, even if the anthem is being sung by an individual performer. During opposing teams' introductions, students turn around to face away from the court and throw up "The U." During Miami's home introductions, the student section links arms and rocks left to right, going faster and faster before erupting into cheers for the Hurricanes. For Miami's free throws, students hold up one finger, all jumping once on a made free throw and twice on the second free throw if both free throws are made.

Storm Surge also organizes watch parties and live online blogs for every away game. These events are open to all students and typically take place on campus. Following major road wins, the group gathers at the BankUnited Center to greet and congratulate the returning Hurricanes team, a tradition that has since carried over to football. Membership in the organization also entitles students to exclusive meet and greets with players, priority seating to games, and promotions and giveaways.

Larrañaga Lawn
In 2012, due to unprecedented demand for student tickets to the January 23 game against the #1 ranked Duke Blue Devils, students camped out on an adjacent field to the BankUnited Center, which was promptly dubbed "Larrañaga Lawn," after Coach Jim Larrañaga. Students camped out for several other games during the 2012–2013 season, including sold out contests against FSU and UNC. Coach Jim Larrañaga and members of the team always greet students lined up on Larrañaga Lawn both the night before the game and again on game day, often bringing food to students in line. Lawn sports such as football, frisbee, and Kan-jam have become popular ways for students in line to pass the time on Larrañaga Lawn.

National attention
Storm Surge made national headlines in 2012 during Miami's home game against UNC, when students chanted "Austin Rivers" at UNC free throw shooter Tyler Zeller, whom Rivers had hit a buzzer beater over in UNC's previous game. Storm Surge was again in the national spotlight following Miami's 90–63 rout of Duke in January 2013 when students rushed the court in celebration. The student section has been praised by many notable visitors, including Miami basketball alumni Jimmy Graham, Warren Sapp, Dick Vitale, and Carlos Boozer.

In 2013, Storm Surge received a number of accolades, including three of the "Best Fan Signs in College Basketball" by USA Today and was featured on national programs such as PTI, SportsCenter, and CBS's documentary "March Madness Fandemonium". In addition, it was recognized as one of the toughest ACC venues by ESPN during numerous broadcasts throughout the season. On January 24, 2013, Storm Surge was featured on the front page of The Miami Herald following Miami's win over Duke. On February 9, 2013, Storm Surge was featured on the landing page of ESPN.com following Miami's blowout home win over UNC.

After losing its flair following some up-and-down seasons, the student section was renamed to "The Eye" at the start of the 2021-22 season. More about The Eye can be found on Category 5's page, which is the University of Miami's official student school spirit organization.

Facilities

Miami Beach Auditorium

Miami Beach Convention Center

The Miami Hurricanes played their home games at the Miami Beach Convention Center from 1956-1971.

James L. Knight Center (1985–1988)

On November 12, 1985, the Knight Sports Complex was dedicated at a gala banquet that was held on the basketball courts of the new structure. CBS basketball analyst Billy Packer served as the evening’s guest speaker for an event that welcomed more than 500 guests to the on-campus home of Hurricane basketball. The facility served as the practice home to the men’s and women’s basketball programs, while also housing the men’s basketball coaching staff offices until the team moved to Miami Arena in 1988. In addition, the Knight Sports Complex enabled the athletic program to more than double the size of the existing strength room, while also providing meeting rooms and lecture rooms for all of Miami’s student-athletes.

Miami Arena (1988–2002)

The Hurricanes called Miami Arena home from 1988 until December 2002. The downtown arena attracted large crowds for marquee opponents as the program began play in the Big East Conference in 1991. The school shared the facility with the NBA's Miami Heat and the NHL's Florida Panthers until each respective professional franchise built newer stadiums.

Watsco Center (2002–present)

After years of planning, Hurricanes basketball finally moved on-campus on January 4, 2003 when the Hurricanes defeated No. 22 North Carolina in overtime to christen the opening of the Convocation Center (nicknamed the "Convo"). The $48 million facility was funded through private donations, though was later renamed the BankUnited Center in 2005. In 2016, the University announced the renaming of the facility as the Watsco Center.

References

External links

 

Sports in Coral Gables, Florida
Miami Hurricanes men's basketball